Julio Gómez (born 27 January 1963) is an Argentine long-distance runner. He competed in the men's 5000 metres at the 1984 Summer Olympics.

References

1963 births
Living people
Athletes (track and field) at the 1984 Summer Olympics
Argentine male long-distance runners
Olympic athletes of Argentina
Place of birth missing (living people)